Ankita Das (born 17 July 1993) is an Indian table tennis player from Siliguri, West Bengal. She participated in World Championship and reached quarter-finals.

She represented India at the 2012 London Summer Olympics in Women's singles event.
She was also the youngest girl in that Olympic.

Career

Ankita Das has won senior championship at the 75th senior National table tennis championships (2014)

Das has won championship at the 75th senior National table tennis championships (2014) Women's singles event. before was practicing under of Coach Mantu Gosh Arjuna Awardee. she was the youngest girl in that olympic. she played in junior world championship 2011, singles quarterfinalist and got fair play award. she made history in that tournament, she got most popular player award in senior asian championship, made history again, 10 years she played national final continues in her career, its history in indian table tennis. she played cadet world challenge, and got gold medal in the teams, and singles got 8th position, she played lusofonia games and got bronze, silver, gold in that tournament.

See also

 India at the 2012 Summer Olympics
 Table tennis at the 2012 Summer Olympics
 Table tennis at the 2012 Summer Olympics – Qualification

References

External links
 Ankita Das bio
 Ankita Das Photo Gallery

Living people
Olympic table tennis players of India
Sportswomen from West Bengal
Table tennis players at the 2012 Summer Olympics
People from Darjeeling
Bengali sportspeople
Indian female table tennis players
People from Siliguri
1993 births
Table tennis players at the 2014 Asian Games
21st-century Indian women
21st-century Indian people
Racket sportspeople from West Bengal
Asian Games competitors for India